Kiera Cass (born 19 May 1981) is an American writer of young adult fiction, best known for The Selection series.

Career
Cass was born and raised in Myrtle Beach, South Carolina and graduated from Socastee High School in Myrtle Beach. She is of Puerto Rican descent. She attended Coastal Carolina University before transferring to Radford University. She graduated from Radford with a degree in History.

The first book in The Selection trilogy, The Selection, was published in 2012 by HarperTeen. Television rights for the trilogy were optioned by the CW Television Network and two pilots were filmed, but neither were picked up for a full series. In April 2015, movie rights for The Selection trilogy, The Selection were acquired by Warner Bros.

In May 2013, Cass announced that she would be working on an as-yet untitled series she refers to as 238 on social media, to be published by HarperCollins. The series was cancelled and Cass pursued other projects. .

On August 14, 2014, Kiera Cass announced that The Selection series would be expanding into more books. First, The Elite, was published in 2013. "The One" followed.  The Heir followed in 2015. Cass announced another book following The Heir, The Crown, which was released on 3 May 2016.

On August 20, 2015, Kiera Cass announced that her originally self-published book The Siren would be rewritten and rereleased on January 26, 2016. 

On October 7, 2019, Kiera Cass announced that her novel The Betrothed would be released on May 5, 2020. It followed Hollis Brite, a daughter of nobility, who was courted by King Jameson of Coroa to be his queen. Hollis fell in love with an Isolten commoner named Silas, and she had to choose between two paths. The book became a #1 New York Times bestseller.

The sequel to the Betrothed, titled The Betrayed, was released on June 29, 2021. 

Kiera Cass' latest book, A Thousand Heartbeats, was released on November 29, 2022.

The Selection

The Selection series, which is what Cass is best known for, is a series of five young adult novels set in the fictional country of Illéa, formally North and Central America. The books are about a competition known as The Selection, where citizens of Illéa compete for the current king's heir in marriage. The first three books are from the point of view of America Singer, joining the selection after bribery from her mother, who doesn't know she is in love with Aspen, who is a caste lower than her. The two sequels, The Heir and The Crown are written from the point of view of Princess Eadlyn, the firstborn daughter of Prince Maxon and Lady America Singer.

Plot and setting 
America Singer is a seventeen-year-old girl who lives in the country of Illéa, which was once the United States. Their society is divided into eight castes, the lowest and poorest being Eight and royalty One. America is a Five and is in a secret relationship with a Six named Aspen Leger, which they kept hidden by sneaking out at night for dates in her backyard tree house. When America and Aspen grow apart because Aspen feels like he will never be able to provide for her, he tells her to join the Selection, a competition designed to pick a woman to become the future wife of Prince Maxon and take on the role of Queen of Illea. Although America is indifferent to the Prince and the Selection, she is pushed by her mother and Aspen's words to apply. Miraculously, she gets in and is sent to the palace, where she slowly falls for the prince and begins to learn that there are rebels who want change in the country. 

Aspen is drafted for the army and sent to be a guard at the palace which confuses America as her relationship with Maxon develops. Her friendship with Maxon slowly grows into affection until one day when one of the Selected girls, a friend of America, is caned and thrown out publicly for being found kissing one of the guards. America becomes enraged at the way things are run and realises what being the princess would entail, and takes it out on Maxon, becoming distant from him. As other girls are slowly eliminated from the Selection, America and Maxon slowly get closer again and apologize to each other during a rebel attack at the palace while in hiding together. 

Their relationship goes through many ups and downs, until Maxon sends everyone in the Selection home except for America and another girl named Kriss. Maxon tells America he loves her but finds out about her previous relationship to Aspen which she had been hiding from him. He becomes angry and takes back the known engagement. The next morning a rebel attack happens. Maxon is shot and apologizes to America, saying he does not care if she breaks his heart a thousand times, he still wants her and no one else. The King and Queen are killed by the rebels, leaving Maxon to become the King. He proposes to America and he reveals he will eliminate the castes.

The next two books occur twenty years later, where Maxon and America now have four children, the oldest of which is Princess Eadlyn, the current heir to the throne. The castes have been slowly phased out, but there are still constant uprisings. To quell the public, Maxon decides to organize another Selection.

Characters
 America Singer – The protagonist of the first three novels. She is a somewhat rebellious girl with intentions to do right. She has red hair and is 17 years old at the beginning of the novel. 
 Prince Maxon Calix Schreave – The heir of King Clarkson Schreave and Queen Amberly Schreave. He has blonde hair and brown eyes. 
 Aspen Leger – The ex-boyfriend and first love of America. Later on, a guard at the palace. He has dark hair and green eyes.
 Celeste – One of the Selected who is rivals—at first—with America, but they mend their differences and become friends. She is killed during the last rebel attack by the Southern Rebels.
 Marlee – America's first and best friend at the palace. She is caned and let go from the Selection after being found having a relationship with a guard named Carter whom she later marries.
 May Singer – America's younger sister. Looks just like her, the cutest and closest sibling of America. Does not have control over her emotions, which is very sweet in the novel.
 Shalom Singer- He was America Singer's father. Shalom was a Five and a Northern rebel. One of his most important lines, "And I hope you get married for love and not a number." He died on Christmas Eve.
 Kriss- Northern Rebel and the second most favorite of the Prince, with her place to the top. She joined the selection for the crown but later got in love with Maxon. America's constant friend and competition.
 King Clarkson Schreave – A harsh king and Prince Maxon's father. He despises America and mistreats Maxon. He dies in the final rebel attack.
 Queen Amberly Schreave – A gentle and kind queen. Also, the mother of Prince Maxon. Unlike the king, she is kind to America. She also dies in the last rebel attack.
 Anne – One of three of America's kind and caring maids during the selection. She is strong and the one who takes charge.
 Lucy – Just like Anne, Lucy is one of the maids America had during the Selection. She is timid and falls in love later with Aspen. 
 Mary – A steady and hardworking maid of America's during the time of the Selection.
 Elise – A quiet girl. She is one of the last four Selected remaining, known as the "Elite".

Reception 
The A.V. Club commented that the first book in the series "is something of a Hunger Games rip-off, but at least it's an entertaining one".

On 4 February 2015 The Guardian posted a review about Kiera Cass, saying, "Cass makes it a suspenseful read with dramatic events and romantic moments and you never know what is coming up in the next chapter". On 24 October 2015, The Guardian added, "The story is also excellent for gripping people who don't generally enjoy reading".

The Siren
Cass is also the author of The Siren. This book is about Kahlen, a girl who lost her family on cruise ship overturned then she was chosen to become a siren and needs to serve the Ocean for a hundred years. Her voice is deadly for humans. Then one day she meets the Akinli, boy of her dreams, and wants to be with him but she can't. She struggles with her emotions for a while as her "sisters" try to talk her out of him.

Kiera originally self-published "The Siren" online in 2008. On January 26, 2016, it was released by HarperCollins after Cass rewrote it into an updated version.

Controversy
On 12 January 2012 a one-star review of Cass' book, The Selection, was posted on the book reviewing site Goodreads, and on the reviewer's blog. Later on the same day, Kiera Cass' literary agent, Elana Roth, posted a series of derogatory tweets on the social networking site Twitter. In a conversation that Cass and Roth believed was private—but was, in fact, public—Roth called the reviewer names and both Roth and Cass discussed how best to bump the negative review down and boost positive reviews by manipulating the ranking system themselves. The controversy sparked an article by Publishers Weekly speaking out against this practice and raised an outcry from multiple reviewers, bloggers, and publications against the cyber-bullying of non-professional reviewers by authors and agents.

Bibliography

The Selection series
The Selection (2012)
The Elite (2013)
The One (2014)
The Heir (2015)
The Crown (2016)

Novellas

The Prince (2013)
The Guard (2014)
The Selection Stories: The Prince & The Guard (2014)
The Queen (2014)
The Favorite (2015)
The Selection Stories: The Queen & The Favorite (2015)
Happily Ever After (contains all of the above Novellas and The Maid) (2015)

Stand-alone novels

 The Siren (2009)
  A Thousand Heartbeats (2022)

The Betrothed 

 The Betrothed (2020) 
 The Betrayed (2021)

References

External links

 – September 2015, the only evident content is "News"

 
 

1981 births
American young adult novelists
21st-century American women writers
Living people
Place of birth missing (living people)
Women writers of young adult literature
Writers of young adult science fiction
American women novelists
21st-century American novelists
People from Myrtle Beach, South Carolina
Novelists from South Carolina
Radford University alumni
Coastal Carolina University alumni
American people of Puerto Rican descent